The United States Army Infantry School is a school located at Fort Benning, Georgia that is dedicated to training infantrymen for service in the United States Army.

Organization
The school is made up of the following components:
 197th Infantry Brigade
2nd Battalion, 29th Infantry
1st Battalion, 46th Infantry
2nd Battalion, 47th Infantry
3rd Battalion, 47th Infantry
3rd Battalion, 54th Infantry
 198th Infantry Brigade (Reflagged from Infantry Training Brigade) (ITB)
1st Battalion, 19th Infantry
2nd Battalion, 19th Infantry
1st Battalion, 50th Infantry
2nd Battalion, 54th Infantry
2nd Battalion, 58th Infantry

For new recruits beginning their specialized training in the infantry, the 197th and 198th Infantry Brigades conduct 22 weeks of One Station Unit Training (OSUT) consisting of both Basic Combat Training (BCT) and Advanced Individual Training (AIT). The mission of the brigades is to transform civilians into disciplined infantrymen that possess the Army Values, fundamental soldier skills, physical fitness, character, confidence, commitment, and the Warrior Ethos to become adaptive and skillful infantrymen ready to close with and destroy the enemies of the united states.

 199th Infantry Brigade (Reflagged from 11th Infantry Regiment)
2nd Battalion, 11th Infantry (Infantry Basic Officer Leader Course) (IBOLC)
3rd Battalion, 11th Infantry (Officer Candidate School) (OCS)
3rd Battalion, 81st Armor Regiment (MCoE Provost)
Maneuver Captains Career Course
International Student Training Detachment
United States Army Sniper School
Henry Caro Non-Commissioned Officers Academy
Maneuver Senior Leaders Course (M-SLC), formerly Advanced Noncommissioned Officer Course (ANCOC)
Advanced Leaders Course (ALC), formerly Basic Noncommissioned Officer Course (BNCOC)
Warrior Leader Course (WLC), formerly Primary Leadership Development Course (PLDC)
 Airborne and Ranger Training Brigade
 4th Ranger Training Battalion (Camps Rogers and Darby)
Ranger School (Benning Phase)
Reconnaissance and Surveillance Leaders Course (RSLC)
 5th Ranger Training Battalion (Camp Frank D. Merrill)
Ranger School (Mountain Phase)
 6th Ranger Training Battalion (Camp Rudder, Auxiliary Field 6, Eglin Air Force Base, Florida)
Ranger School (Swamp Phase)
 1st Battalion, 507th Infantry Regiment
Airborne School
Jumpmaster School
Silver Wings (MCoE Command Exhibition Parachute Team)
Combined Arms and Tactics Directorate (CATD)
Directorate of Operations and Training/G-3
Training Support Center
Office of Infantry Proponency (OIP) "Warrior Ethos" program that was launched in 2003 by the United States Army.

Infantry officers who have completed commissioning and the Basic Officer Leadership Course then attend the Infantry Officer Basic Leadership Course in 2nd battalion. This is a course of instruction, as the name implies, in basic infantry skills, including marksmanship, machine gunnery, tactics, and planning.

The brigade also conducts specialized training for soldiers in Basic Airborne, Pathfinder, and Jumpmaster Courses.

Former Units
For many years the 1st and 2nd Battalions of the 29th Infantry Regiment provided branch specific programs of instruction as part of the Infantry school. In July 2007 the 29th Infantry Regiment was reflagged into the 197th Infantry Brigade as part of the Army's transition to a Brigade focused structure. This organization continued until 12 December 2013 when the 197th Infantry Brigade was deactivated. Shortly thereafter the programs of instruction provided by the 29th Infantry Regiment were consolidated under 1st Battalion 29th Infantry Regiment, reflagged as part of the 316th Cavalry Brigade, and the 2nd Battalion 29th Infantry Regiment was deactivated. Under the purview of the Maneuver Center of Excellence (MCoE), as part of the 316th Cavalry Brigade, 1st Battalion 29th Infantry Regiment continues to teach combat skills and support MCoE training, the Infantry School, and Infantry Soldiers and leaders by providing the following courses: 
Bradley Leaders Course (BLC)
Bradley Master Gunner (BMG) Course
Combatives Course
Dismounted C-IED Tactics Master Trainer (DCT-MT) 
Heavy Weapons Leader Course
Simulations Training Managers Course (STMC) 
Stryker Leader Course (SLC)
Stryker Master Gunner Course (SMGC)
Small Unmanned Aircraft System Master Trainer (SUAS)

Commandant 
The Chief of Infantry is the proponent of the school and its commandant.

See also
 Basic Officer Leaders Course
 United States Army branch insignia
 Guidon (United States)
 Combat Infantryman Badge
 Blue Infantry Cord

References

External links
Infantry School homepage

Official site of the Infantry Training Brigade

United States Army schools
Universities and colleges accredited by the Council on Occupational Education
1918 establishments in Georgia (U.S. state)
Educational institutions established in 1918
Infantry training